NABO or Nabo may refer to:

National Association of Boat Owners, a boating organization in the UK
North American Boxing Organization, a boxing organization in the US
 An alternative spelling of the ancient Mesopotamian god Nebo or Nabu
 The Spanish and Portuguese name of Brassica napus
Nabo Gass (born 1954), German painter and glass artist

See also
Naboo, a planet in the fictional Star Wars universe